Collinsville is a town in DeKalb and Cherokee counties in the U.S. state of Alabama. It was incorporated in 1887. As of the 2010 census, the population was 1,983.

Collinsville's largest employer is Koch Foods. It is a poultry plant that employees approximately 800 employees.

Geography
Collinsville is located in southern DeKalb County at 34°15'55.555" North, 85°51'41.483" West (34.265432, -85.861523). A small portion extends southeast along Alabama State Route 68 into Cherokee County. The town is located in the Little Wills Valley, between Lookout Mountain to the east and the smaller Big Ridge to the west.

Demographics

2020 census

As of the 2020 United States census, there were 2,059 people, 685 households, and 492 families residing in the town.

2010 census
As of the 2010 census Collinsville had a population of 1,983. The racial and ethnic composition of the population was 44.9% non-Hispanic white, 9.0% black or African American, 1.1% Native American, 0.1% Asian, 2.1% Pacific Islander (all of whom where Guamanian or Chamorro), 36.8% reporting some other race and 3.0% from two or more races. 43.1% of the population was Hispanic or Latino of any race.

2000 census
As of the census of 2000, there were 1,644 people, 565 households, and 367 families residing in the town. The racial makeup of the town was 63.32% White, 16.18% Black or African American, 1.52% Native American, 0.85% Asian, 13.99% from other races, and 4.14% from two or more races. 23.48% of the population were Hispanic or Latino of any race.

There were 565 households, out of which 29.9% had children under the age of 18 living with them, 40.4% were married couples living together, 18.2% had a female householder with no husband present, and 35.0% were non-families. 29.4% of all households were made up of individuals, and 15.2% had someone living alone who was 65 years of age or older. The average household size was 2.62 and the average family size was 3.20.

In the town, the population was spread out, with 24.1% under the age of 18, 10.3% from 18 to 24, 24.4% from 25 to 44, 19.2% from 45 to 64, and 22.0% who were 65 years of age or older. The median age was 36 years. For every 100 females, there were 90.9 males. For every 100 females age 18 and over, there were 85.4 males.

The median income for a household in the town was $21,964, and the median income for a family was $27,500. Males had a median income of $20,114 versus $16,635 for females. The per capita income for the town was $13,042. About 22.2% of families and 25.7% of the population were below the poverty line, including 33.3% of those under age 18 and 27.0% of those age 65 or over.

Education
Collinsville Elementary (K-6) and Collinsville High (7-12), home of the Panthers. The CHS football team was the first football team in Dekalb County. The Panthers' first team was in 1920. The schedule in 1920 included a regular season game vs. Jacksonville State University. Collinsville also has a very strong tradition in other sports. For instance, the first All-American in basketball at The University of Alabama, Lindy Hood, was a Collinsville alum.

Collinsville currently competes in Class 3A.

The schools are members of the DeKalb County School System.

Collinsville High School Has Won 3 State Championships

Boys Basketball - 1975 (1A)

Boys Soccer - 2013 (1A-4A)

Girls Basketball - 2020 (2A)

Climate
The climate in this area is characterized by hot, humid summers and generally mild to cool winters.  According to the Köppen Climate Classification system, Collinsville has a humid subtropical climate, abbreviated "Cfa" on climate maps.

Tourism

Collinsville is home to the Collinsville Trade Day, which is held every Saturday. It is estimated that 10,000 people visit the trade day each week, a number which may reach 30,000 in spring. The trade day was originally located outside the city limits, but was annexed in 2004.

References

External links
Town of Collinsville official website

Towns in Alabama
Towns in Cherokee County, Alabama
Towns in DeKalb County, Alabama
U.S. Route 11